Sir John Hurt, CBE (1940–2017) was an English actor and voice actor whose career spanned six decades. He had roles in over 130 films with dozens of television roles.

Film

Television

Video games

Other projects and contributions 
 When Love Speaks (2002, EMI Classics) – "Sonnet 145"("Those lips that Love's own hand did make")
 Hurt performs in drag for the promotional video for Attitude by the music group Suede.
 Hurt is seen as the 'Brian Epstein' esque mogul in Paul McCartney's 1982 video for his song "Take It Away". McCartney explains in the video commentary section of The McCartney Years DVD (for the song 'Take it Away') that Hurt himself was a friend of the Beatles and Brian Epstein, and that the Beatles had watched Hurt act in the mid-'60s and thought him a fine actor.
 Hurt is the narrator of the 1995 Discovery Channel documentary On Jupiter.
 Narrator on the album The Seduction of Claude Debussy by the band Art of Noise (1999).
 Hurt is the narrator of the 4 part series The Universe for Channel 4 International, released in 1999 and available on DVD.
 Hurt co-starred alongside Kiefer Sutherland in the 10 part web series The Confession.
 A line from the movie Nineteen Eighty-Four featuring the voice of Hurt can be heard as the introduction to the Manic Street Preachers song "Faster"
 In two volumes of a documentary called Life in the Animal Kingdom: Untamed Africa, filmed in the Maasai Mara Game Preserve in Kenya (the two volumes being called Hunter and Hunted and Survival on the Serengeti), Hurt served as the narrator.
 Benjamin Britten – Peace and Conflict, a British feature film written and directed by Tony Britten – narrator.
 Narrator for the BBC 5 live documentary "The day we won Wimbledon."
 Narrator of the Mercedes F1 Team video ad based on the poem "If—" by Rudyard Kipling.
Voice of the father (in the letter to his son) in the animated short The Alchemist's Letter  by Carlos Andre Stevens.
Following Hurt's role of The War Doctor in Doctor Who, he voiced the character in four audio sets from Big Finish Productions beginning in December 2015. The second set was released in February 2016, the third in September 2016 and the fourth posthumously in February 2017.
Hurt voiced the character of Griffin in an audio drama of The Invisible Man for Big Finish Productions released posthumously in February 2017.

References

Male actor filmographies
British filmographies